Ernanodon antelios ("a growing sprouts of toothless animals") is an extinct placental mammal from the middle Paleocene Nongshan Formation of China.

When it was first discovered and examined, it was thought to be a primitive anteater. E. antelios and Eurotamandua of Eocene Germany helped to support a now-abandoned hypothesis that there was movement between the faunas of South America (the homeland of anteaters and other Xenarthrans), and the faunas of Europe and Asia, by way of North America. This was further supported by the alleged European Phorusrhacid Strigogyps, also of Eocene Germany.

The view of E. antelios being an anteater has been discarded, and the idea that there was any extensive Paleocene faunal interchange with South America has been rethought due to Eurotamandua being now regarded as a scaleless relative of the modern-day pangolin, and the various European Phorusracids being reidentified as more primitive members of Cariamae.

E. antelios' placement within Xenarthra is further questioned because it lacks the distinctive joints that characterize Xenarthra, the same reason why Eurotamandua is no longer regarded as a xenarthran.  Recent studies from new remains found in Late Paleocene Mongolian strata  have led to the assessment that Ernanodon is closely related to Metacheiromys within the taxon Palaeanodonta, which, in the study, was reaffirmed to be the sister taxon of Pholidota, the order of pangolins.

Phylogenetic tree
The phylogenetic relationships of genus Ernanodon is shown in the following cladogram:

References

Bibliography 

 
 
 
 
 
 

Palaeanodonta
Thanetian life
Ypresian life
Eocene mammals of Asia
Paleocene mammals of Asia
Paleogene China
Fossils of China
Fossil taxa described in 1979